Radu Gînsari (born 10 December 1991) is a Moldovan professional footballer who plays as a winger or a midfielder for Milsami Orhei.

He also possesses Russian citizenship as Radu Leonidovich Gynsar and was registered with the Russian Premier League as a domestic player.

Club career

Early career
Started playing football at the age of 8 years old, at a club "Razdisor" from Ciocana region. After a few months of training, he was transferred to CSCT Buiucani at the age of 9 years old, having Jardan Vasile as his coach. Then, during 3–4 years, has been trained some important chapters of the Book of Football from Andronic Mihai. At the age of 15 he continued his training with another coach, Ciubaru Igor, so that at the age of 16, was purchased by FC Academia UTM Chişinău, where he played five years.

His initial position on the field was a central midfielder, but sometimes he was played as a winger or forward. The most comfortable position he feels playing on, and also the position where he is most efficient is a central midfielder.

Initially he started playing with the number 4 on his shirt when he was playing at CSCT Buiucani. Then it was changed to number 14, which he thinks that it is his lucky number.

Professional career
He spent 5 years playing for FC Academia Chişinău. In the winter of 2013 he had trials at Rubin Kazan, but for undisclosed reasons hadn't signed with the Russian side. Before he signed with Zimbru Chișinău in the summer, he had trials at Olhanense, but unfortunately he didn't sign eventually as he got injured in training. In his first season for Zimbru Chișinău he scored 6 goals and he won the Moldovan Cup. On 11 June he announced on his Facebook page that he is no longer a Zimbru player with a message, "On this day officially I announce that I have left the club.I want to thank all the teammates and staff.Good luck!". On 16 June he signed with Sheriff Tiraspol. His first goal for Sheriff Tiraspol was in the Moldovan Super Cup match against his previous club, Zimbru Chișinău. Unfortunately, his team has lost at the penalty kicks.

On 28 June 2019, he joined Russian Premier League club PFC Krylia Sovetov Samara. On 6 February 2020, he returned to Israel, joining Ironi Kiryat Shmona on a 6-month loan.

On 26 February 2021, Gînsari returned to Moldova, signing for Moldovan National Division side FC Milsami Orhei.

International career
During his tenth cap, Gînsari scored his first international goal. It came against Switzerland in a friendly match in June 2016.

Gînsari scored again, in a 3–1 defeat to Turkey during a March 2017 friendly match.

Career statistics

International goals
As of match played 18 November 2018. Moldova score listed first, score column indicates score after each Gînsari goal.

Personal life

Family 
Radu was born to Elena and Leonid Gînsari. He has a brother named Sandu Gînsari.

Radu Gînsari declares himself as Romanian and supports the reunification of Moldova and Romania.

Education 
He graduated with a bachelor in Modern Languages and Management in 2010. He is currently a student at Moldova State University with the Faculty of Finance and Banking.

Honours
Zimbru Chișinău
Moldovan Cup: 2013–14

Hapoel Haifa
Israel State Cup: 2017–18
Israel Super Cup: 2018

Individual
Moldovan National Division Best Forward: 2014

References

External links

1991 births
Living people
Moldovan footballers
FC Zimbru Chișinău players
FC Sheriff Tiraspol players
Hapoel Haifa F.C. players
PFC Krylia Sovetov Samara players
Hapoel Ironi Kiryat Shmona F.C. players
FC Milsami Orhei players
Xanthi F.C. players
Moldovan Super Liga players
Israeli Premier League players
Russian Premier League players
Super League Greece 2 players
Moldovan expatriate footballers
Expatriate footballers in Israel
Expatriate footballers in Russia
Expatriate footballers in Greece
Moldovan expatriate sportspeople in Israel
Moldovan expatriate sportspeople in Russia
Moldovan expatriate sportspeople in Greece
Footballers from Chișinău
Association football forwards
Moldova international footballers